The cryptic flycatcher (Ficedula crypta) is a species of bird in the family Muscicapidae.
It is endemic to the Philippines only being found in the island of Mindanao. Its natural habitat is tropical moist mid-montane forests from 600 - 1,500 meters.

Description 
EBird describes the bird as "A small bird. Dark brown above with a rufous tail, a white belly, a pale gray chest, and a buffy face and throat. Forages low down or on the ground and may sit motionless for periods of time. Similar to female Little slaty flycatcher, but has a rufous tail, a brown throat, and black rather than orange legs. Gives a short descending trill." 

Its drab colour, low foraging areas and its habit of being perched motionless  most likely makes this bird overlooked and unnoticed.

Habitat and Conservation Status 
Found in both primary and secondary forest. It is a mid-montane species with its altitude range of where it is seen is 600 - 1,500 meters above sea level.  It is known to forage low in the tree line, often perching on the ground. 

IUCN has assessed this bird as a least-concern species . While it has a limited range, is supposedly common in areas it is found.however the population is said to be decreasing. This is due to habitat loss due to legal and illegal logging, mining and conversion into farmlands through Slash-and-burn or other methods.

References

cryptic flycatcher
Birds of Mindanao
cryptic flycatcher
Taxonomy articles created by Polbot